Pšov is a municipality and village in Karlovy Vary District in the Karlovy Vary Region of the Czech Republic. It has about 600 inhabitants.

Administrative parts
Villages of Borek, Chlum, Kobylé, Kolešov, Močidlec, Novosedly and Semtěš are administrative parts of Pšov.

References

Villages in Karlovy Vary District